Terrace is an unincorporated community in Chippewa Falls Township, Pope County, Minnesota, United States.  The community was settled in the 1870s around the Terrace Mill. In 1982, a historic district of early buildings and structures was listed on the National Register of Historic Places as the Terrace Historic District for having local significance under the themes of exploration/settlement and industry. It was nominated as a well-preserved example of the small communities that grew up around Minnesota's rural mills in the latter 19th century.

History
Terrace was established by George Wheeler, John Wheeler, and William Moses; settlers who had moved from eastern Canada to Owatonna, Minnesota, to the Minnesota frontier to establish a mill. Located on the East Branch of the Chippewa River, the town was originally called Chippewa Falls, but soon changed names due to ongoing confusion with Chippewa Falls, Wisconsin. The original mill relocated to Brooten circa 1895, but in 1903 a new miller constructed the existing Terrace Mill and resumed the town's founding industry.

Historic district
The Terrace Historic District consists of 13 contributing properties.  Five contributing properties closely associated with the mill itself were originally listed on the National Register as the Terrace Mill Historic District in 1979, but a more comprehensive historic district was declared in 1982 in recognition of the rare integrity of the broader community.  Early rural mill towns tended to be abandoned due to the cessation of small milling operations and competition from towns prospering along railroad lines.  They are particularly rare in western Minnesota, where settlement was minimal until rail lines were laid.  The properties of the Terrace Historic District represent the full suite of industrial, commercial, educational, social, religious, and residential structures comprising a small community.

See also
 National Register of Historic Places listings in Pope County, Minnesota

References

External links

Unincorporated communities in Minnesota
Unincorporated communities in Pope County, Minnesota
Historic districts on the National Register of Historic Places in Minnesota
National Register of Historic Places in Pope County, Minnesota